The  Human. :II: Nature. World Tour is the ongoing eighth world tour by Finnish symphonic metal band Nightwish, in support of their ninth studio album, Human. :II: Nature..

It is the first tour in which Kai Hahto is an official member of the band, following original drummer Jukka Nevalainen's departure on July 15, 2019. It is also the first tour not to feature bassist Marko Hietala following his departure in January 2021, and the first to feature bassist Jukka Koskinen as a session bassist who later joined the band in August 2022.

Background 

In promoting the tour and the album before its release, Troy Donockley and Floor Jansen were special guests on Planet Rock Radio, performing acoustic versions of "Nemo" and "How's the Heart?".

Following the postponement of the tour due to the COVID-19 pandemic, the band was set to begin the world tour on March 12, 2021 with an interactive livestream experience in a virtual reality built tavern which will feature songs from the album on its setlist. The virtual livestream show was later postponed to May 2021. Upon the conclusion of the virtual performances, the shows had broken records with the first drawing 150,000 viewers and setting it as the most viewed virtual performance in Finland, with the box office exceeding one million in euros.

The band began the tour in Europe, South America, Asia and North America following the virtual performance. The tour was originally scheduled to begin in spring 2020, but due to the pandemic, the band had postponed the tour. The European tour was postponed again to late 2021 on January 29, 2021, but had added a new date in Dublin, Ireland. The band returned to Hellfest in Clisson, France on July 25, 2022. Additional tour dates for North America were announced on October 12, 2021. European tour dates for November and December were later confirmed to go ahead for the band. Shows that were postponed in Europe that year were later rescheduled for the end of 2022. Following the announcements of shows in Kitee and Vaasa, the tour is set to conclude in June 2023.

At the Oslo performance during their performance of "The Greatest Show on Earth", the band paid tribute to the late Alexi Laiho, a deceased member of the former Children of Bodom by displaying a picture of him on the video screen. The Pinkpop festival on June 17, 2022 had the band's set shortened, as Jansen had performed solo on the same day. During the Amsterdam show on November 27, 2022, Henk Poort joined on stage with Jansen to perform "The Phantom of the Opera", with the show being filmed for a future live release. Yannis Papadopoulos from Beast in Black later joined the band on stage at the Prague concert on December 21, 2022 to perform "Sahara".

Following Marko Hietala's departure from the band in January 2021, the band had announced in a statement that there will be a temporary live member to fill in for bass. It was announced on May 28, 2021 before the first virtual performance that Jukka Koskinen would be the session bass player exclusively for the tour. However, the band later announced on August 21, 2022 that Jukka Koskinen would be the new permanent bass player in the band.

Shortly after the Latin American leg of the tour in October 2022, vocalist Floor Jansen underwent a successful breast cancer surgery. The band resumed its third European leg in November and December. It was then announced that Jansen's radiation therapy was moved from February to January 2023, resulting in the postponement of the band's Asian tour.

Reception 
Natasha Scharf, a reviewer from Louder Sound, had given the virtual performances a positive review. She stated: "Despite the technological limitations, Nightwish genuinely look like they're having the best time ever and there's no hint of the concerns Tuomas Holopainen had about their future. It's been two and a half years since their last live show and they've clearly missed the stage. Tonight's set is tight and packed with material from Human. :II: Nature., fan favourites and some surprising additions, including Harvest, Bless the Child, and a lovely acoustic rendition of How's the Heart? The intimate setting also captures friendly gestures that might have otherwise been missed; the band frequently exchange grins and nods, and Jansen even gives Koskinen a heartfelt thumbs-up during Ghost Love Score."

Norway Rock Magazine gave the Oslo performance at the Spektrum a positive review. Opening their review, they acknowledged the impressive stage production and setlist, they stated that the band didn't disappoint their fans which gave the band a rapturous reception. Praising Floor Jansen on her flawless performance and powerful vocals as well as being mastering at connecting with the audience, they also praised the chemistry and dynamic stage presence from all of the other members, which made it clear the band missed performing in front of an adoring audience. Concluding their review, they said the band know how to put on a superb live show, they finished their review stating that the show really was the 'Greatest Show on Earth'.

Samantha Wu from the Spill Magazine opened her review, noting on the anticipation of fans who were eager to hear the tracks from the band's new album live, knowing what to expect: soaring orchestral music with hard, ripping guitars and Floor Jansen's complex voice, which Wu acknowledged as "ground-breaking" despite the difficulty some of the songs were to sing. Having acknowledged the departure of former member Marko Hietala, she also mentioned the soft and melodic vocals of Troy Donockley - taking notes on how he paired it with Jansen's vocals during an acoustic version of "How's the Heart?". Wu concluded their review stating that the band delivered a whirlwind of an experience and that it was the best return to live music anyone could ask for.

Opening acts 
 Asim Searah (Oulu)
 Beast in Black (Europe, North America, Latin America)
 Boudika (Latin America)
 Amorphis (Europe)
 Chaos Magic (Latin America)
 Lähiöbotox (Europe)
 Mister Misery (Europe)
 Sonata Arctica (Europe)
 Turmion Kätilöt (Europe)

Setlist

Sample Setlist
The following setlist was performed at the warm-up show of the tour at Club Teatria, and is not intended to represent all of the shows on tour.

"Music" (intro tape)
"Noise"
"Planet Hell"
"Tribal"
"Élan"
"Storytime"
"How's the Heart?"
"Harvest"
"7 Days to the Wolves"
"Dark Chest of Wonders"
"I Want My Tears Back"
"Ever Dream"
"Nemo"
"Sleeping Sun"
"Shoemaker"
"Last Ride of the Day"
"Ghost Love Score"
"The Greatest Show on Earth (Chapters I, II and III)"
"Ad Astra" (outro tape; with Floor singing live)

Tour dates 

 A This is a secret concert that the band performed under the pseudonym "Nevski & the Prospects".

Postponed and cancelled dates

Extra concerts

Personnel 

 Floor Jansen – lead vocals
 Tuomas Holopainen – keyboards
 Emppu Vuorinen – guitars
 Kai Hahto – drums, percussion
 Troy Donockley – uilleann pipes, tin whistle, bouzouki, male vocals, additional guitars
 Jukka Koskinen – bass

Guest musicians
 Henk Poort – guest vocals (Amsterdam, Europe 2022)
 Yannis Papadopoulos – guest vocals (Prague, Europe 2022)

References

Notes

Citations

External links
Nightwish's Official Website

Nightwish concert tours
2021 concert tours
2022 concert tours
2023 concert tours
Concert tours of North America
Concert tours of Canada
Concert tours of the United States
Concert tours of Europe
Concert tours of the United Kingdom
Concert tours of France
Concert tours of Germany
Concert tours of South America
Concert tours of Asia
Concert tours of Japan
Concert tours of the Philippines
Concert tours of Taiwan
Concert tours postponed due to the COVID-19 pandemic